Álvarez or Álvares may refer to:

People
Álvarez (surname), Spanish surname

Places
Alvares (river), a river in northern Spain
Alvares (ski resort), in Iran
Alvares, Iran
Alvares, Portugal
Álvarez, Santa Fe, a town in the province of Santa Fe, Argentina
Álvarez, Tamaulipas, Mexico
Alvarez Glacier, Antarctica
General Mariano Alvarez, Cavite, Philippines
Los Alvarez, Texas, US
3581 Alvarez, an asteroid

Other uses
Alvarez (Gotham), a character in the TV series Gotham
 Manny Alvarez, a character in The Last of Us Part II
Alvarez Guitars, an acoustic guitar manufacturer
"Alvarez", a song by the band Funeral for a Friend

See also
Álvares, a Portuguese and Galician surname
Alvarez' syndrome, a medical disorder

be:Альварэс
ca:Álvarez
es:Álvarez
fi:Álvarez
fr:Álvarez
it:Álvarez
ja:アルバレス
pt:Álvarez
ro:Álvarez
ru:Альварес
uk:Альварес (значення)
zh:阿尔瓦雷斯